Holiday-themed horror films or holiday horror are a subgenre of horror films set during holidays. Holiday horror films can be presented in short or long formats, and typically utilize common themes, images, and motifs from the holidays during which they are set, often as methods by which the villain may murder their victims.

Film scholars Chris Vander Kaay and Kathleen Fernandez-Vander Kaay explain the subgenre as such: "The expression 'adding insult to injury' is an excellent encapsulation of the motivation behind the horror movie obsession with holidays (aside from the obvious desire to brand a killer with a theme and costume that can be revisited many times within a lucrative film franchise). The holiday is a place for happiness and family... The horror movie loves nothing more than irony (except perhaps a good death scene), and there is very little more ironic than the fear and isolation of a horror movie taking place right in the middle of the festivities."

List of films 
The following is a list of holiday horror films that depict or are set during a holiday or holiday season.

1900s

1910s

1920s

1930s

1940s

1950s

1960s

1970s

1980s

1990s

2000s

2010s

2020s

See also
 Into the Dark, a holiday horror anthology TV series
 Lists of films set around holidays
 List of films set around Easter
 List of films set around Father's Day
 List of films set around Halloween
 List of films set around Thanksgiving
 List of films set around May Day
 List of films set around Mother's Day
 List of films set around New Year
 List of films set around St. Patrick's Day
 List of films set around Valentine's Day

References

Works cited

Holiday

horror